American rapper Eminem has produced many songs by various artists/musicians, including himself.

Singles produced

Full production list

Notes
 signifies a co-producer.
 signifies an additional producer.

See also
 Eminem albums discography
 Eminem singles discography
 Eminem videography
 Bad Meets Evil discography
 D12 discography

References

Production discographies
 
 
Hip hop discographies
Discographies of American artists